Roger Suárez Sandoval (born April 2, 1977 in Santa Cruz de la Sierra) is a former Bolivian football striker who last played for San José in Bolivia.

His former clubs include Oriente Petrolero, Bolívar, The Strongest, Universitario de Sucre, Nacional Potosí and Blooming in Bolivia, Club Atlético Aldosivi in Argentina, and Ecuadorian side Deportivo Cuenca.

Nicknamed "Sucha", Suárez has played for the Bolivia national team between 1996 and 2004, scoring 7 goals in 29 games.

Car accident

On March 20, 2010, after practice, Suárez left with teammate Wilber Zabala in his vehicle. Just a couple of miles from Blooming's training ground, they were hit by a mid-size truck on the passenger side where Suárez was sitting. An ambulance was immediately called by witnesses at the scene, and he was rushed to a nearby hospital where they discovered he had fractured twelve ribs as a result of the collision. He spent five days in the intensive care unit before he regained his consciousness and was able to speak again. He spent 10 months away from the field. Finally, in January 2011 he returned to professional football when he signed for San José. That same year he retired from the sport.

Club titles

References
Sources
 
 
 

Notes

1977 births
Living people
Sportspeople from Santa Cruz de la Sierra
Bolivian footballers
Bolivia international footballers
Bolivian expatriate footballers
2001 Copa América players
2004 Copa América players
Oriente Petrolero players
Club Bolívar players
Club Blooming players
The Strongest players
Club San José players
C.D. Cuenca footballers
Expatriate footballers in Ecuador
Aldosivi footballers
Expatriate footballers in Argentina
Association football forwards